Pudur or 46 Pudur is a village in the Modakurichi taluk of Erode district in the south Indian state of Tamil Nadu.

Demographics 
 census, Pudur (46) village had a total population of 16,054 with 8129 males and 7925 females. Out of the total population 1440 are under 6 years of age. Pudur has a literacy rate of 83.70% which is higher than Tamil Nadu average.

Developments
The population of the village is increasing due its presence along the periphery of Erode city. This panchayat was included as a part of Erode Local Planning Area, since the establishment of Erode Local Planning Authority. The Ring Road laid for Erode passes through this village, where a new Bus stand has been built. In 2016, Erode Municipal Corporation council declared a resolution to merge Pudur (46) with Erode Corporation jurisdiction.

References

Villages in Erode district